Volume is the quantity of space an object occupies in a 3D space.

Volume may also refer to:

Physics
 Volume (thermodynamics)

Computing
 Volume (computing), a storage area with a single filesystem, typically resident on a single partition of a hard disk
 Volume (video game), a 2015 video game by Mike Bithell
 Volumetric datasets (3D discretely sampled data, typically a 3D scalar field), which can be visualized with:
 Volume rendering
 Volume mesh
 Isosurface
 The Volume, the soundstage in the StageCraft on-set virtual production visual effects technology

Publishing
Volume (bibliography), a physical book; the term is typically used to identify a single book that is part of a larger collection, but may also refer to a codex
Volume (magazine), a 1990s UK music magazine
Volume Magazine, quarterly architecture magazine
Volume! The French Journal of Popular Music Studies, an academic journal

Music
Volume may refer to a sound level assessment, such as:
Amplitude
Loudness
Dynamics (music)
The Volumes, a 1960s American musical group
Volumes, an American progressive metalcore band

Other uses
Volume (finance), the number of shares or contracts traded in a security or an entire market during a given period of time
Volume (film), a 2012 short film directed by Mahalia Belo

See also
"Twenty volumes", a non-scientific description of the concentration of a solution of hydrogen peroxide
Volumography, the science, art and practice of creating three-dimensional space images
Volume form, used in mathematics
Volume One (disambiguation)
Volume Two (disambiguation)